Lina Lehtovaara (nee Långbacka, born 23 June 1981) is a Finnish football referee who has been a FIFA referee since 2009. Football Association of Finland has awarded Lehtovaara as the Referee of the Year in 2015–2016 and 2018–2021.

Lehtovaara has refereed in the Finnish women's premier division Kansallinen Liiga and the men's second and third tiers Ykkönen and Kakkonen. In 2022, Lehtovaara refereed the 2022 UEFA Women's Champions League Final between FC Barcelona and Olympique Lyon. She was also one of the referees of the UEFA Women's Euro 2022.

Lehtovaara lives in Pargas and works as a teacher. Her brother is the former football goalkeeper Gustav Långbacka.

References 

1981 births

Living people
People from Kokkola
Finnish football referees
Women's association football referees
Women referees and umpires